Dobrzynski or Dobrzyński is the name of:

 Judith Helen Dobrzynski (born 1949), American journalist
 Ignacy Dobrzyński (1779–1841), Polish musician
 Ignacy Feliks Dobrzyński (1807–1867), Polish composer, son of Ignacy
 Joanna Dobrzyńska (née Miller), singer, wife of Ignacy Felix
 Bronisław Dobrzyński, Polish musician, son of Ignacy Felix
 Edward Dobrzyński (died 1858), Polish musician, son of Ignacy
 Leszek Dobrzyński (born 1967), Polish politician